Choerophryne burtoni is a species of frog in the family Microhylidae. It is endemic to Papua New Guinea.

References

burtoni
Amphibians of Papua New Guinea
Amphibians described in 2007